The 1895 Missouri Tigers football team was an American football team that represented the University of Missouri as a member of the Western Interstate University Football Association (WIUFA) during the 1895 college football season. In its first season under head coach C. D. Bliss, the team compiled a 7–1 record (2–1 against WIUFA championship) and finished in a three-way tie with Kansas and Nebraska for the conference championship.

Schedule

References

Missouri
Missouri Tigers football seasons
Missouri Tigers football